Soyvolovskaya is a rural locality (a village) in Nelazskoye Rural Settlement, Cherepovetsky District, Vologda Oblast, Russia. The population was 30 as of 2002. There are 6 streets.

Geography 
Soyvolovskaya  is located 43 km northwest of Cherepovets (the district's administrative centre) by road. Pleshanovo is the nearest rural locality.

References 

Rural localities in Cherepovetsky District